An-Nasr Mosque ( Masjid an-Nasr translated as "Victory Mosque") is a mosque located in the Palestinian city of Nablus. It is situated in the central square of the Old City and is donned as the "symbol of Nablus". An-Nasr Mosque has a turquoise dome and its prayer room is located in the second floor of the building.

History
Originally, an-Nasr was a Byzantine church, and then the Templars constructed a small church which consisted of a circular building with a red dome during the Crusader rule of Palestine. The Crusaders lost Nablus in 1187 to the Ayyubids and by the 14th century Nablus was in Mamluk hands. The Mamluks transformed the Crusader church into the three-nave an-Nasr Mosque. The Ottomans built a government building adjacent to the mosque. An-Nasr was destroyed by an earthquake that struck Nablus in 1927.

The Supreme Muslim Council under Amin al-Husayni constructed the an-Nasr Mosque on the site with a completely different structural design in 1935. The reconstruction was supervised by Shaykh Amr Arafat, a resident of Nablus whose clan — the Fityanis — served as the mosque's waqf superintendents. The imam of the mosque is traditionally of the Hanafi fiqh. According to Islamic tradition, an-Nasr Mosque is built on the exact spot where Yaqub (Jacob) was brought the "bloody and tattered coat" of Yusuf (Joseph) by his sons.

In February 1998, violence in Nablus between Israeli soldiers and Palestinians that resulted in several Palestinian deaths occurred after Israeli soldiers squabbled with Palestinian worshippers at an-Nasr Mosque.

Gallery

See also
 Great Mosque of Nablus

References

Mosques in Nablus
10th-century mosques
Mosques completed in 1935
Mosques converted from churches